The Tinto River is a river in Honduras. It is a tributary of the Guayape River.

Etymology

The Tinto was also called the Cuyamel, as of 1850.

See also
List of rivers of Honduras

References

Footnotes

Sources
Rand McNally, The New International Atlas, 1993.
CIA map: :Image:Honduras rel 1985.jpg
UN map: :Image:Un-honduras.png
Google Maps

Rivers of Honduras